Yavatmal Assembly constituency is one of the 288 constituencies of the Maharashtra Vidhan Sabha and one of the seven which are located in the Yavatmal district in the Indian state of Maharashtra.

It is a part of the Yavatmal-Washim (Lok Sabha constituency) with adjoining Washim district along with five other Vidhan Sabha assembly constituencies, viz. Washim(SC) and Karanja from Washim district and Ralegaon(ST), Digras and Pusad from the Yavatmal district.

The remaining constituencies from Yavatmal district, Wani and Arni are part of Chandrapur (Lok Sabha constituency) while Umarkhed is part of the Nanded (Lok Sabha constituency).

Members of Legislative assembly

Results

2019 result

2014 result

See also
Yavatmal

Notes

Assembly constituencies of Maharashtra
Yavatmal district
Yavatmal